Khanlanlu (also Romanized as Khanlānlū; also known as Khalānlū) is a village in Shahrestaneh Rural District, Now Khandan District, Dargaz County, Razavi Khorasan Province, Iran. At the 2006 census, its population was 314, in 80 families.

References 

Populated places in Dargaz County